Hell's Kitchen Australia was an Australian cooking reality competition television series which premiered on the Seven Network on 6 August 2017. The series was hosted by British chef Marco Pierre White, who previously hosted two seasons of the British version of the format and appeared on MasterChef Australia.

Production

The series began casting for celebrity contestants in late 2016, and filmed in Sydney for six weeks in March and April 2017. It is produced for the Seven Network by ITV Studios Australia.

Program sponsorships include Aldi, Airtasker, Diaego, Lurpak and Sony Pictures.

Celebrities

The following ten celebrities have been competing in the series to win AU$50,000 for their chosen charity.

Results and elimination

 Celebrity was on the Blue Team 
 Celebrity was on the Red Team
 Celebrity was on the White Team
 Indicates that the celebrity won the series
 Indicates that the celebrity finished runner-up
 Indicates that the celebrity finished in third place
 Indicates that the celebrity was in the bottom 3
 Indicates that the celebrity was evicted immediately (no bottom three)

Series details

Week 1

Services

 Episodes 1 to 3
 Airdates - 6 to 8 August 2017
 Description - A celebrity from the losing team in two dinner services and a lunch service (60 covers), based on their performance that night, is chosen by Marco to go into an elimination challenge at the end of the week. Winners of the first challenge gain immunity, winners of the second can be excused from doing prep work for both kitchens. Before service 1, each person must make an egg dish, Debra won immunity, and they get masterclasses to get new menu. In a relay challenge before service 2, a member from each team must finely chop an onion, garlic, parsley, slice a big mushroom and truss a chicken with the head chopped off and wishbone removed, in which Blue team won 3-2. Service 2 always featured Marco and/or the sous chefs leaving the kitchen mid-service, and anyone working the pass must relay, expedite and co-ordinate orders and manage the dessert orders and clear-downs on their own. Before service 3, which is always the more hectic lunch service, everybody is assigned to a different position, and the red team's steamer leaked water, making it out of order. Debra was out during service as she badly cut herself trying to grab a knife to cut fruits for the dessert.

Last chance cook-off
 Episode 3
 Airdates - 8 August 2017
 Description: - In a "Taste it & Make it" elimination challenge, the three celebrities had to taste a dish that Marco had created, which was a chicken skewer with spring onion and madras curry powder cooked in olive oil, and remake it.

Week 2

Services

 Episodes 4 to 6
 Airdates - 13 to 15 August 2017
 Description - A celebrity from the losing team in two dinner services and a lunch service (70 covers per service), based on their performance that night, is chosen by Marco to go into an elimination challenge at the end of the week. The menu is completely different from last week. In the cases were teams draw even, Marco nominates the weakest celebrity from both teams, then chooses the weakest overall to send to elimination. Issa won the immunity challenge before the first service as he beat Debra on the 'Perfectly Cooked Skinless Salmon Fillet Challenge', despite Debra made a perfect Ceviche to strategically save her injured hand from contacts with heat and water. Before service 2's relay challenge, they were at Sydney Fish Market to learn to prepare shellfish as they were special items on the menu. The teams must unshell and de-vein the shrimps, shuck oysters from the back (the English method) with sea water retained,  devein, gut and cut the marron into halves, and one will separate and gut the already-cooked crab, with the claws separated and one piece of shell cracked open. Sam sits out the challenge as Red team has a one-person advantage.  Pettifleur secured the win 3-1 overall after her crab retained more of the claws' meat  than Issa. This time, with Red team's win, they can choose to cook for the portion of guests out of 70 for the dinner service, but they forego the number's advantage in that regard and split it fairly (35 for each team), in which Marco said that David should have listened to Lincoln and took on 5 extra covers given the extra-person advantage, rather than trying to hamstring them by increasing their workload. Pettifleur is taken away from the red team as she must prepare and serve the extra starter: The 70's style shrimp cocktail table-side for both red and blue team unassisted from the kitchen crew. During service 2, Lincoln's mother was amongst the guests, and Marco had to shut down an incorrect claim by a customer where the salmon starter was frozen, and ask David not to engage because she was incorrect, and has never tried salmon confit-style, before walking out to monitor them from his office. After that service, Jacqueline, Lincoln's mother, fuelled the State of Origin-like rivalry, while Issa met his fan. In service 3, David and Gaz's partners and friends were amongst the customers.

Last chance cook-off

 Episode 6
 Airdates - 15 August 2017
 Description: -  In a "Taste it & Make it" elimination challenge, the three celebrities had to taste a dish that Marco had created, which was a turkey schnitzel with Parmesan and rosemary cooked in clarified butter.

Week 3

Services

 Episodes 7 to 9
 Airdates - 20 to 22 August 2017
 Description - A celebrity from the losing team in two dinner services and a lunch service, with the restaurant at capacity (80 covers), based on their performance that night, is chosen by Marco to go into an elimination challenge at the end of the week. Before service 1, they learn to make Venetian-style risotto with grated onion and garlic, cooked in butter, olive oil, white wine (Pinot Grigio) and rosemary, then coated in Parmesan and butter, but in a two-people team challenge, they have 45 minutes (instead of 30 in the demonstration) to make a risotto of their choice. Lincoln and Jess' risotto beat Willie and Issa's risotto that both almost replicated Marco's only with added chicken stock and mushrooms, and they gain immunity. Before service 2, they learn to make tagliatelle pasta from scratch with the dough already made by Pina, before a pairs team challenge. Using the pre-made batches of dough, they must roll and hang as much tagliatelle as they can in each 5-minute interval. Blue team lost because most of the tagliatelle became unusable after Willie and Gaz tangled them, so blue team's punishment is to make all the pasta special for both teams, which was replaced by macaroni as both team don't have enough usable tagliatelle together, while also making everyone work at station that they have yet to be in.

Last chance cook-off

 Episode 9
 Airdates - 22 August 2017
 Description: -  In a "Taste it & Make it" elimination challenge, the three celebrities had to taste a dish that Marco had created, which was beef and pork meatballs, served with parsley and manchego cheese, and finished in the oven

Week 4

Services

 Episodes 10 to 12
 Airdates - 28 and 29 August 2017
 Description - In the first service, a chef from the losing team is chosen from the 2 dinner services and a lunch service (80 covers plus a turnover-round of 10 covers) based on their performance that night, and Marco forewarned that two celebrities will be eliminated at the end of the week. Before service one, all must create a family-sized salad to be individually portioned off table-side. Lincoln won with a Caesar salad, but with an invented salad dressing with honey, soy sauce and mayonnaise with unlikely help from Mason, who made his own steak salad since they both can't make Caesar dressing. With the blue team back to the most comfortable stations, except Debra chose to work at the pass. Before second service, teams must cut a lamb's entire rib cage into 10 lamb chops and 10 lamb racks, then pan-fry the lamb cutlets with olive oil, lemon juice  and rosemary. The relay is: With the pine already removed, 6 of 7 members trims and cuts the lamb cutlets (Issa sits out), then they must marinade and cook their own lambs, but they must use their own marinade. With Mason, Gary and Lincoln having the same marinade (thyme, rosemary, olive oil and mint), Mason decided to pour white wine vinegar during cooking.  In the head-to-head, Sam beat Gary for her quantity, and her clever time management for managing three uneven-sized cutlets. Debra beat Lincoln in quantity., despite both are perfectly cooked. Mason won it for the blue team as Sam's cutlets were unseasoned. Blue team won, and elected Lincoln to make the lamb racklk special for both teams on top of being in charge of the fish station, with Sam in charge of the meat and the Moroccan-style lamb rump. Marco questioned Mason's tactic as he could had taken on the role himself, so Marco put him as a floater-sweeper.  In the second service, when both teams scored equally, Marco nominated Lincoln and Issa as the weakest in their respective teams, Issa was chosen because he has diminished role and presence in the kitchen as the one in charge of the fish.  In the third service, Issa served as a waiter for delivering food for the blue team as he was already in the last-chance cook-off, while the remaining chefs were scored individually by diners, with Marco choosing the weakest from the lowest ranked chefs. Sam's family were amongst the guests. They compete in a last chance cook off.

Last chance cook-off

 Episode 12
 Airdates - 29 August 2017
 Description: - In a "Taste it & Make it" elimination challenge, the three celebrities had to taste a dish that Marco had created, which was a Blue-eyed cod fillet, with boiled potatoes with saffron, accompanied by a smoked paprika mayonnaise. Unlike past weeks, two chefs were dismissed in this week.

Week 5 - Finals Week

 Episodes 13 to 15
 Airdates - 4 and 5 September 2017
 Description - This week saw the final five cooks being merged into one team. Instead of Blue and Red Teams, they became the White Team. The weakest cook, as picked by Marco, from the two services (60 covers plus a turnover-round of 0 covers) are immediately eliminated, but the guests score the team as a whole.

Before service one, all contestants become the instructors, expeditor and taste-tester, and their family members must recreate a dish under the contestant's orders (risotto, family-sized salad, egg florentine, fillet of skin-on salmon) under more lenient time limits (30 minutes for salmon, 35 for egg florentine, 45 for risotto). Dennis (Debra's husband) made family-sized salmon salad, Jacquiline (Lincoln's mother) made a salmon fillet, Kristine (Sam's sister) made Asian-style salmon with asparagus. Emma, (Gaz's girlfriend) came second with the egg florentine. Willie won with his wife, Claire's saffron risotto. The group scored 7.5 overall. In the second service, which is a lunch service, Willie was praised for his efficiency, despite manning 2 fish stations all by himself with most of the guest ordering the salmon main. He was the only person who survived from the fish station. Lincoln was put into the cookoff because he was supposed to be manning the meat station with Gaz, but was demoted to garnish by Gaz. Debra was put into the cookoff by default as Gaz managed most of the workload on the relay and commanded the pass after Marco left the kitchen, and Debra couldn't keep up after they arrived, despite being her best service ever. Gaz and Willie commanded their stations and

There was also a final last chance cook-off between Debra and Lincoln to decide the third and final place in the grand final (Dubbed the "Summer Bay cook-off" as both starred in Home and Away). The dish that they had to cook was kidneys (served pink), coated with flour, chilli power and English mustard  on white bread toast with a devilled sauce in 30 minutes.

The components in question are: Type of bread (white, brioche, cob loaf), main offal (pig heart, liver, kidneys, must pick one from the larder, and cannot change once decisions are made), coating before cooking  (flour, chilli power and English mustard; flour, smoked paprika and cayenne; flour, paprika and turmeric) and the agent used to thicken the pre-prepared devil's sauce (butter, oil, cream).  The winner of the cook-off was Debra, which saw Lincoln's dismissal from Hell's Kitchen. Willie and Gaz can observe live on the other side of the pass.

Grand Final 
 Episode 15
 Airdates - 5 September 2017
 Description: The remaining 3 chefs  compete in an elimination challenge: Roast and carve a full chicken each in 75 minutes, but must include 2 garnishes and a sauce or gravy, and the oven pre-set to 180. Marco is the expeditor, the judges that would be in the blind tastings are the eliminated guests, hidden in the function room away from the restaurant. They would be scored from 1-3, with 3 being the best. David caused issues when he scored Gaz's and Debra's chicken tied for 2 points.

Final service 
 Episode 15
 Airdates - 5 September 2017
 Description: Right after the elimination of Willie, the final service will involve all contestants, with Debra and Gaz being head chefs, they must pick the members and position them and themselves accordingly (dubbed "The Ashes cook-off" by Lincoln as Gaz is from England, and Debra is Australian ). Gaz (pass) picked Willie (fish), Sam (starters, desserts), Lincoln (meat), Issa (starters, desserts). Debra (floater) picked Jess (meat), David (fish), Candice (starters, desserts) and Pettifleur (starters, desserts). Both team captains have white hats, while the rest have black hats. The final dinner service will have 120 covers, meaning the restaurant will be completely turned over twice (2x60 covers), while the kitchen must be cleaned down and reset with them. The menu consists of 3 starters, 2 mains, 3 desserts.   The guest will write comments, but will not score. Colin Fassnidge of My Kitchen Rules amongst the guests in the second round of diners.   Debra won because she led the team of cooks with the least experience, despite her missing that David pre-dressed the second orders of asparagus starter before they were ordered, then him mishearing the two extra orders of salmon was for Gaz's team, and David again completely messing up on the timing.  Gaz's presence was badly drowned by Willie as he has never truly taken on a leadership role in the first round of service, and leaving the salmon station. Debra's $50,000 goes towards the Ovarian Cancer Foundation, but she decided to split it, so $25,000 of which would go towards Australian Wounded Heroes. Debra also received the winner's trophy and Marco's knife.

Reception

Ratings

Hell's Kitchen Australia debuted to 817,000 viewers and was second in its timeslot to The Block (1,212,000).

Critical reception
Colin Vickery, television writer for the Herald Sun was critical of the show, describing Marco Pierre White as "a cartoon version of himself". Vickery also criticised the low-grade nature of the celebrities and the paltry prize on offer. Denise Eriksen, journalist for The New Daily said the show "was a shocker" and that "Seven's execs should have pulled the plug on the show because it doesn't have huge celebrities, it's not that funny and Marco Pierre White isn't Gordon Ramsay". David Knox of TV Tonight, gave the series a rating of 2 out of 5 stars, criticising the show on its low-grade celebrities and that it "lacks the authenticity required of committing to a stripped primetime format in what is already an over-crowded genre".

References

English-language television shows
Seven Network original programming
2017 Australian television series debuts
2017 Australian television series endings
Australian cooking television series
Australian television series based on British television series
2010s Australian reality television series
Hell's Kitchen (TV series)
Cooking competitions in Australia